América Noticias is an Argentine TV news program.

Awards

Nominations
 2013 Martín Fierro Awards
 Best TV news program

References

Television news in Argentina
América TV original programming
2010s Argentine television series